Alejandro Botero López (born October 8, 1980) is a former Colombian football player. He played as goalkeeper in the professional divisions of Colombian and Argentine football.

After his retirement from professional football in 2012, he resumed his career as a commercial aviator, which he had started in the years during which he was playing in Argentine football.

Career

He played in the goalkeeper position, both wearing the shirt of the Colombian professional football team and in football teams in that country and in Argentina.

His sports career began at the age of 18, serving the Deportivo Cali club, where he played for 4 years.

In the Argentine club Independiente de Avellaneda, he was champion in 2002; however, in this club he did not have the opportunity to be a starting goalkeeper.

Later, Botero went down a division to play with Argentinos Juniors. At the end of the 2003–2005 season, this team managed to be promoted to play in the Argentine first division, with Botero having a successful performance.

In September 2005, he returned to the Deportivo Cali club, a Colombian team where he had started his career as a football player. There he won the professional football tournament that year.

In 2006, he returned to Argentine football, playing with the San Martín de San Juan club, where he had the opportunity to play for the second time with a team that was promoted to the Argentine first division.

In 2009, he returned to Colombian football, where he joined the Boyacá Chicó team.

His professional career began in 1998 and ended in 2012.

Retirement from football 

In 2011, while he was playing for the Deportes Tolima team in Colombia, he made the decision to retire from professional football, to dedicate himself to resuming his career as a commercial aviator.

He had already partially started this career, at the Academia Flight Center in Buenos Aires, from the time he was playing in Argentine football.

His father, David Botero, was a tourism agent and airline representative, which inspired Alejandro as a child to be passionate about the field of aviation.

Once he obtained his commercial pilot licenses, Botero López managed to be hired by Avianca.

Clubs

Titles

National championships

Botero developed his entire professional career in the national football of Colombia and Argentina:

See also

 First Division of Argentine Football
 First Division of Colombian Football

External links
 BDFA profile
Statistics at ESPN

References 

1980 births
Living people
Colombian footballers
Association football goalkeepers
Deportivo Cali footballers
Club Atlético Independiente footballers
Argentinos Juniors footballers
San Martín de San Juan footballers
Boyacá Chicó F.C. footballers
Deportes Tolima footballers
Argentine Primera División players
Categoría Primera A players
Colombian expatriate footballers
Expatriate footballers in Argentina
People from Pereira, Colombia